William Devereux Byron II (May 15, 1895 – February 27, 1941), a Democrat, was a U.S. Congressman who represented the 6th congressional district of Maryland from January 3, 1939 to February 27, 1941.  After his death in an airplane crash in Georgia on February 27, 1941, his widow, Katharine Byron, a granddaughter of U.S. Senator Louis E. McComas, was elected in a special election to complete his term of office.

Born in Danville, Virginia, he moved with his parents to Williamsport, Maryland in 1900 where he attended the public schools, Phillips Exeter Academy, Exeter, New Hampshire and Pratt Institute, Brooklyn, New York. The Byron family were communicants at Saint John's Church.  Following his service in the aviation corps during World War I, where he was commissioned a first lieutenant he entered the family leather manufacturing business in 1919. He served in the Maryland Senate from 1930 to 1934 and as mayor of Williamsport from 1926 to 1930 as had his grandfather, for whom he was named.

In 1940 Byron was challenged by baseball legend, Hall of Famer, and Montgomery County Commissioner Walter Johnson. Byron would narrowly prevail, by a total of 60,037 (53%) to 52,258 (47%), thanks in large part to the power of incumbency and FDR's coat tails.

On February 26, 1941, Congressman Byron boarded Eastern Air Lines Flight 21 at Washington.  The plane was en route from New York City to Brownsville, Texas, with stops at Washington, D.C. and Atlanta, Georgia.  On its approach to Atlanta's Chandler Field, the Douglas DC-3 crashed, killing 9 of the 16 persons on board, including Byron. Eddie Rickenbacker, flying ace and President of Eastern, survived with serious injuries. Byron was interred in Riverview Cemetery in Williamsport, Maryland.

His son Goodloe Byron was also a representative from Maryland's 6th congressional district.

See also
 List of United States Congress members who died in office (1900–49)

References

External links
 Byron Family papers at the University of Maryland Libraries 

1895 births
1941 deaths
20th-century American politicians
Accidental deaths in Georgia (U.S. state)
American military personnel of World War I
Byron family of Maryland
Democratic Party members of the United States House of Representatives from Maryland
Democratic Party Maryland state senators
Mayors of places in Maryland
Military personnel from Virginia
People from Williamsport, Maryland
Phillips Exeter Academy alumni
Politicians from Danville, Virginia
Pratt Institute alumni
Victims of aviation accidents or incidents in 1941
Victims of aviation accidents or incidents in the United States